Joseph William Morgan (1898 – 19 September 1962) was a politician from Northern Ireland.

Morgan ran a drapers' shop, but was also a Fellow of the Royal Geographical Society.  He became active in the Ulster Unionist Party (UUP) and was elected at the 1953 Northern Ireland general election, representing Belfast Cromac.  He held his seat at the 1958 general election, not having to face an opponent.  After the election, he was appointed as the first Deputy Chairman of Ways and Means.

In 1960, Morgan was appointed to the Committee of Privileges, and also served on the Ulster Unionist Council.  He again held his seat at the 1962 Northern Ireland general election, but died a few months later.

In his spare time, Morgan was an Orangeman and a member of the Apprentice Boys of Derry.  He was also vice-president of Glentoran F.C.

References

1898 births
1962 deaths
Members of the House of Commons of Northern Ireland 1953–1958
Members of the House of Commons of Northern Ireland 1958–1962
Members of the House of Commons of Northern Ireland 1962–1965
Ulster Unionist Party members of the House of Commons of Northern Ireland
Members of the House of Commons of Northern Ireland for Belfast constituencies